Somebody to Love Me may refer to:

 "Somebody to Love Me" (The Jets song), 1990
 "Somebody to Love Me" (Mark Ronson & The Business Intl. song), 2010
 "Somebody to Love Me", a song by Honeyz from Wonder No. 8
 "Somebody to Love Me", a song by Kellie Pickler from Kellie Pickler
 "Somebody to Love Me", a song by Ronny & the Daytonas

See also 
 Somebody to Love (disambiguation)
 Someone to Love (disambiguation)
 "Someone to Love Me (Naked)", a song by Mary J. Blige
 "Someone to Love Me", a song by Diddy – Dirty Money from Last Train to Paris